Marine Aviation Logistics Squadron 29 (MALS-29) is an aviation logistics support unit of the United States Marine Corps. Known as the "Wolverines", they fall under the command of Marine Aircraft Group 29 and the 2nd Marine Aircraft Wing and are currently based at Marine Corps Air Station New River.  MALS 29 supports multiple types of aircraft and provides detachments to aviation combat elements operating globally in support the United States National Defense Strategy.

Mission

Provide aviation logistics support, guidance, planning and direction to Marine Aircraft Group squadrons on behalf of the commanding officer, as well as logistics support for Navy funded equipment in the supporting Marine Wing Support Squadron (MWSS), Marine Air Control Group (MACG), and Marine Aircraft Wing/Mobile Calibration Complex (MAW/MCC).

History

Early years

The Squadron was activated as Headquarters and Maintenance Squadron 29 (H&MS-29) at Marine Corps Air Station New River, North Carolina and assigned to Marine Aircraft Group 29 (MAG-29) on 1 May 1972. During the years from 1972 through 1976, H&MS-29 operated the MAG-29 Aerial Observer School and performed its primary mission as an Intermediate Maintenance and Supply support activity.

On 1 October 1988, H&MS-29 was re-designated as Marine Aviation Logistics Squadron 29 (MALS-29) as a result of the implementation of the Marine Aviation Logistics Support Package concept.

1990s
In August 1990, MALS-29 commenced its support of Operation Desert Shield by deploying four detachments aboard L-Class ships in direct support of Marine Aircraft Group 40 (MAG-40), 4th Marine Expeditionary Brigade. Additionally, during December 1990, MALS-29, under the operational control of Marine Aircraft Group 26 (MAG-26), deployed to Southwest Asia. MALS-29 was a participant in Operation Desert Storm and distinguished itself with several first-time aviation logistics actions, including operating a fully functional rotary wing Intermediate Maintenance Activity aboard the SS Wright (T-AVB-3), while continuously supporting MAG-26 during the ground war. On 22 May 1991, the squadron recalled its personnel, who were disbursed throughout the Kuwaiti theater of operations, and during June 1991, redeployed itself at MCAS New River, NC. The reconstitution of the Intermediate Maintenance Activity in support of MAG-29 was completed on 1 August 1991.

From 1992 through 1999, MALS-29 continued to support MAG-29 tactical aircraft operations. Over this period, the Squadron underwent extensive changes in personnel and logistical support with the decommissioning of VMO-1 and the transfer of HMT-302 to MAG-29. During 1996, participation in Operation Decisive Endeavor in Bosnia, Operation Assured Response in Liberia, Operation Silver Wake in Albania, and tactical operations in Zaire demonstrated MALS-29's ability to provide expeditionary support around the globe. In 1999, participation in Operation Allied Force, Operation Allied Harbor, Operation Noble Anvil and Operation Joint Guardian placed the MALS-29 detachment within the Aviation Combat Element of the 26th Marine Expeditionary Unit (26th MEU) in support of the Ground Combat Elements peacekeeping mission surrounding the Kosovo Conflict.. Before returning home, the MEU was called to Turkey for disaster relief from the tragic earthquakes for Operation Avid Response.

2000s 
MALS 29 provides Intermediate Level Maintenance (second echelon), Aviation Supply, Class V Munitions / Ordnance, Aeronautical Equipment, Logistical and Information Technology products and services to the flying squadrons of Marine Aircraft Group 29 based in Jacksonville North Carolina. In 2019, MALS 29 is composed of more than 700 Marines, Sailors and civilians in over 35 different aviation technical jobs.

Global War on Terror

In January 2003, MALS-29 deployed in support of Operation Enduring Freedom and a possible larger scale conflict in Iraq. The squadron developed a unique and flexible concept of logistics support while embarking personnel, equipment, and supplies aboard four L-class ships as part of Task Force Tarawa. Throughout the duration of combat operations, MAG-29 squadrons maintained a combined average 81 percent mission capable rate and a 60 percent full mission capable rate.

In March 2004, the Wolverine logistical support was called upon via the activation of the Air Contingency MAGTF in support of security operations in Haiti. MALS-29 deployed again to Iraq in support of Operation Iraqi Freedom in January 2007 for one year and returned February 2008.

Gallery

See also

 United States Marine Corps Aviation
 Organization of the United States Marine Corps
 List of United States Marine Corps aviation support units

Notes

References

Bibliography

Web

 MALS-29’s official website

LOG29